Dora Ng Lei-Lo is a Hong Kong film costume and make up designer.

Filmography
 An Empress and the Warriors (2008)
 CJ7 (2008)
 The Secret of the Magic Gourd (2007)
 The Matrimony (2007)
 Happy Birthday (2007)
 Re-cycle (2006)
 Perhaps Love (2005)
 Seoul Raiders (2005)
 Dumplings and Three... Extremes (2004)
 Three (2002)
 Tokyo Raiders (2000)
 Lavender (2000)
 Skyline Raiders (2000)
 Purple Storm (1999)
 Gorgeous (1999)
 Metade Fumaca (1999)
 Hot War (1998)
 Hero (1997)
 Comrades: Almost a Love Story (1996)
 Who's the Woman, Who's the Man? (1996)
 Peace Hotel (1995)
 He's a Woman, She's a Man (1994)

References

External links
 
 Interview with Dora Ng
 HK cinemagic entry

Hong Kong people
Living people
Chinese costume designers
Year of birth missing (living people)